The 2022–23 UCF Knights women's basketball team represented the University of Central Florida during the 2022–23 NCAA Division I basketball season. The Knights compete in Division I of the National Collegiate Athletic Association (NCAA) and the American Athletic Conference (The American). The Knights, in the program's 46th season of basketball, are led by first-year head coach Sytia Messer, and play their home games at the Addition Financial Arena on the university's main campus in Orlando, Florida.

This is also the last season UCF play in the American Athletic Conference before moving to the Big 12 Conference.

Previous season 
The Knights finished the 2021–22 season 22–3 and were American Athletic Conference champions at 14–1, winning the conference tournament and an automatic bid to the 2022 NCAA Division I women's basketball tournament, where they defeated Florida in the first round before losing to UConn in the second round.

Offseason

Departures
Due to COVID-19 disruptions throughout NCAA sports in 2020–21, the NCAA announced that the 2020–21 season would not count against the athletic eligibility of any individual involved in an NCAA winter sport, including women's basketball. This meant that all seniors in 2020–21 had the option to return for 2021–22.

Incoming transfers

Recruiting
There were no recruiting classing class of 2022.

Roster

Schedule and results

|-
! colspan=12 style=| Exhibition

|-
! colspan=12 style=| Non-conference regular season

|-
! colspan=12 style=| AAC regular season

|-
! colspan=12 style=| AAC Women's Tournament

Rankings

*The preseason and week 1 polls were the same.^Coaches did not release a week 2 poll.

See also
 2022–23 UCF Knights men's basketball team

References

External links
 Official Team Website

UCF
UCF Knights women's basketball seasons
UICF Knights
UICF Knights